is a passengerrailway station located in the city of Shimanto, Kōchi Prefecture, Japan. It is operated by JR Shikoku and has the station number "G35".

Lines

Layout
The station, which is unstaffed, consists of a side platform serving a single track. There is no station building, only a shelter for waiting passengers. A ramp leads up from the access road to the platform. There is a toilet building next to the ramp and a bike shed is located across the access road.

Adjacent stations

|-
!colspan=5|JR Shikoku

History
The station opened on 26 March 1953 under the control of Japanese National Railways. After the privatization of JNR on 1 April 1987, control of the station passed to JR Shikoku.

Surrounding area
Shimanto Municipal Nishigakata Elementary School
Hiromi River

See also
 List of railway stations in Japan

References

External links
 Station timetable

Railway stations in Kōchi Prefecture
Yodo Line
Railway stations in Japan opened in 1953
Shimanto, Kōchi (city)